Mevlüt (from ) is a Turkish given name for males. People named Mevlüt include: 

 Mevlüt Çavuşoğlu, Turkish diplomat and politician; current Minister of Foreign Affairs of Turkey
 Mevlüt Erdinç, Franco-Turkish footballer, who plays for Paris Saint-Germain as a defender
 Mevlüt Mert Altıntaş, assassin of Russian Ambassador to Turkey Andre Karlov

Turkish masculine given names